Amy Hetzel (born 27 April 1983 in Rockhampton, Queensland) is an Australian former water polo player and television sports presenter. She was a member of the Australia women's national water polo team that won a bronze medal at the 2008 Beijing Olympics. and silver at the 2007 World Championships in Melbourne.

She has previously worked as a sports reporter and producer on Sports Tonight for Network Ten and ONE HD. She currently works as a sports presenter and producer for the Australian Broadcasting Corporation (ABC) News24.

See also
 List of Olympic medalists in water polo (women)
 List of World Aquatics Championships medalists in water polo

References

External links
 

1983 births
Living people
Australian female water polo players
Olympic bronze medalists for Australia in water polo
Water polo players at the 2008 Summer Olympics
Medalists at the 2008 Summer Olympics
People educated at Brisbane State High School
21st-century Australian women
20th-century Australian women
Sportspeople from Rockhampton
Sportswomen from Queensland
Australian women television presenters
Australian women television producers
Australian Broadcasting Corporation people